James Patrick Hogan (September 21, 1890 in Lowell, Massachusetts – November 4, 1943 in North Hollywood, California) was an American filmmaker.

His movies included Bulldog Drummond's Secret Police (1939) and The Mad Ghoul (1943), his last film. He died from a heart attack aged 53.

Filmography

 The Skywayman (1920)
 The Little Grey Mouse (1920)
 Bare Knuckles (1921)
 Where's My Wandering Boy Tonight? (1922)
 Unmarried Wives (1924)
 Black Lightning (1924)
 Capital Punishment (1925)
 Women and Gold (1925)
 The Mansion of Aching Hearts (1925)
 Capital Punishment (1925)
 Jimmie's Millions (1925)
 The Bandit's Baby (1925)
 My Lady's Lips (1925)
 S.O.S. Perils of the Sea (1925)
 Steel Preferred (1925)
 The King of the Turf (1926)
 The Isle of Retribution (1926)
 Flaming Fury (1926)
 The Final Extra (1927)
 The Silent Avenger (1927)
 Mountains of Manhattan (1927)
 Finnegan's Ball (1927)
 The Broken Mask (1928)
 Hearts of Men (1928)
 Burning Bridges (1928)
 Code of the Air (1928)
 Top Sergeant Mulligan (1928)
 The Border Patrol (1928)
 The Sheriff's Secret (1931)
 The Seventh Commandment (1932)
 Paradise Valley (1934)
 Life Returns (1935)
 Desert Gold (1936)
 The Arizona Raiders (1936)
 The Accusing Finger (1936)
 Arizona Mahoney (1936)
 Bulldog Drummond Escapes (1937)
 The Last Train from Madrid (1937)
 Ebb Tide (1937)
 Scandal Street (1938)
 Bulldog Drummond's Peril (1938)
 The Texans (1938)
 Sons of the Legion (1938)
 Arrest Bulldog Drummond (1939)
 Bulldog Drummond's Secret Police (1939)
 Grand Jury Secrets (1939)
 Bulldog Drummond's Bride (1939)
 $1000 a Touchdown (1939)
 The Farmer's Daughter (1940)
 Queen of the Mob (1940)
 Texas Rangers Ride Again (1940)
 Ellery Queen's Penthouse Mystery (1941)
 Power Dive (1941)
 Ellery Queen and the Perfect Crime (1941)
 Ellery Queen and the Murder Ring (1941)
 A Close Call for Ellery Queen (1942)
 A Desperate Chance for Ellery Queen (1942)
 Enemy Agents Meet Ellery Queen (1942)
 No Place for a Lady (1943)
 The Strange Death of Adolf Hitler (1943)
 The Mad Ghoul (1943)

External links 
 
 
 James P. Hogan at the AFI Catalog of Feature Films

1890 births
1943 deaths
American film directors
People from Lowell, Massachusetts